Bill J. Dukes (February 26, 1927 – December 18, 2014) was an American politician from Decatur, Alabama.

Born in Tarma, Kentucky, Dukes served in the United States Army. He then went to University of Mississippi and received his bachelor's degree from Bowling Green College of Commerce. He was an office manager, assistant to the Mayor of Decatur, Alabama. Dukes served on the Decatur City Council in 1968 and then served as Mayor of Decatur from 1976 until 1994. From 1994 until 2010, he served in the Alabama House of Representatives. Dukes died in Decatur, Alabama of Parkinson disease.

Notes

1927 births
2014 deaths
Politicians from Decatur, Alabama
People from Muhlenberg County, Kentucky
Military personnel from Kentucky
Western Kentucky University alumni
Alabama city council members
Mayors of places in Alabama
Members of the Alabama House of Representatives
Neurological disease deaths in Alabama
Deaths from Parkinson's disease
20th-century American politicians
21st-century American politicians